Joseph Brooks Bloodgood Parker  (December 25, 1889 – November 30, 1951) was an American foil sabre fencer. He competed at the 1920 and 1924 Summer Olympics.

References

External links
 

1889 births
1951 deaths
American male foil fencers
Olympic fencers of the United States
Fencers at the 1920 Summer Olympics
Fencers at the 1924 Summer Olympics
Fencers from Philadelphia
American military personnel of World War I
American male sabre fencers